The 1998–99 season was Parma Associazione Calcio's 9th season in Serie A. The club competed in Serie A, finishing fourth, and won both the Coppa Italia and the UEFA Cup.

Season review
Parma won two trophies in one of the club's most successful seasons. The Coppa Italia win over Fiorentina was followed by a spectacular 3–0 victory against French giants Marseille in the UEFA Cup Final. In the league, Parma could not quite match Milan and Lazio, but managed to clinch the fourth and final Champions League spot.

In the summer, Parma was hit by the departure of playmaker Juan Sebastián Verón to Lazio. The club brought in Ariel Ortega as his replacement, but clearly lost a key ingredient in its perennial championship challenge.

Players

Squad information
Squad at end of season

Transfers

Left club on loan during season

Sold by club during season

Competitions

Overall

Last updated: 23 May 1999

Serie A

League table

Results summary

Results by round

Matches

Coppa Italia

Round of 32

Round of 16

Quarter-finals

Semi-finals

Final

UEFA Cup

First round

Second round

Third round

Quarter-finals

Semi-finals

Final

Statistics

Appearances and goals

Goalscorers

Last updated: 23 May 1999

References

Parma Calcio 1913 seasons
Parma
UEFA Europa League-winning seasons